WPMI-TV (channel 15) is a television station licensed to Mobile, Alabama, United States, serving as the NBC affiliate for southwest Alabama and northwest Florida. It is owned by Deerfield Media alongside Pensacola, Florida–licensed independent station WJTC (channel 44); Deerfield maintains a local marketing agreement (LMA) with Sinclair Broadcast Group, owner of Pensacola-licensed ABC affiliate WEAR-TV (channel 3) and Fort Walton Beach–licensed MyNetworkTV affiliate WFGX (channel 35), for the provision of certain services.

WPMI-TV and WJTC share studios on Azalea Road (near I-10) in Mobile; master control and some internal operations are based at the shared facilities of WEAR-TV and WFGX on Mobile Highway (US 90) in unincorporated Escambia County, Florida (with a Pensacola mailing address). WPMI-TV's transmitter is located in unincorporated Baldwin County, Alabama (northeast of Robertsdale).

History

Early history
WPMI first signed on the air on March 12, 1982 and was the first independent station in the state of Alabama. It was also the first new commercial station to sign on in the Mobile–Pensacola market since future sister station WEAR signed on 28 years earlier. The station was originally owned by Hess Broadcasting and ran a general entertainment programming format consisting of cartoons, westerns, classic sitcoms, old movies, drama shows, and religious programs. WPMI's original studios were located on St. Michael Street in Mobile. In 1985, Hess sold WPMI to Michigan Energy Resources. However, the sale did not affect programming practices. By that time, WPMI was acquiring stronger programming, such as more recent cartoons and off-network sitcom reruns. On October 9, 1986, WPMI became a charter affiliate of the Fox network and began offering prime time programming six months later.

In January 1989, Michigan Energy Resources sold WPMI to Clear Channel Communications; the company (the current-day iHeartMedia) at the time was still a small radio broadcaster in the pre-Telecommunications Act of 1996 era, and WPMI's purchase was its first foray into television.

In 1991, Clear Channel entered into a local marketing agreement, which became a common practice at that time, with Mercury Broadcasting-owned WJTC (channel 44). The company purchased programming time on WJTC to run shows on that station that either did not fit onto WPMI's schedule or were being burned off.

NBC affiliation
Fox wanted to upgrade affiliates in many markets when it acquired the rights to broadcast games from the NFL's National Football Conference in the mid-1990s. After signing an affiliation deal with New World Communications to switch its "Big Three" affiliates to Fox, the network decided to make affiliate upgrades in smaller markets. In 1995, Fox formed SF Broadcasting in a joint venture with Savoy Pictures, which the network owned a voting stock in, and bought three NBC affiliates and an ABC affiliate; one of the NBC stations it acquired was local rival WALA-TV (channel 10). Almost by default, WPMI was then left to take the NBC affiliation. On January 1, 1996, WALA switched its affiliation to Fox, while the NBC affiliation moved to WPMI. The first NBC program to air on WPMI was Today at 7:00 a.m. Central Time.

Upon becoming an NBC affiliate, the station began airing more syndicated talk and reality shows. The NBC affiliation's move to WPMI resulted in the station having to move most of the syndicated cartoons and most of the off-network sitcoms that it would no longer have time to air due to network programming commitments to LMA partner WJTC, which became a UPN affiliate two weeks after the switch on January 11, 1995. Clear Channel purchased WJTC outright in 2004, creating a duopoly with WPMI.

On April 20, 2007, Clear Channel Communications entered into an agreement to sell its television stations to private equity firm Providence Equity Partners, in order to focus on its radio properties. On March 15, 2008, WPMI and the other Clear Channel television properties were sold to Providence Equity-operated Newport Television.

In 2009, WPMI began using digital billboards within its viewing area, which featured headlines from the station's Twitter feed alongside a photo of anchors Greg Peterson and Kym Thurman, and chief meteorologist Derek Beasley, a juxtaposition that would prove to be awkward when a headline regarding three people accused in a gang rape which occurred in Monroeville, Alabama appeared next to the staff picture. A motorist took a picture of the digital billboard and sent it to a South Carolina-based blog, "The Palmetto Scoop". The picture would later appear on Mashable, and was then distributed worldwide in e-mails and other blogs, becoming an internet meme. WPMI general manager Shea Grandquest and news director Wes Finley were reportedly suspended over the incident, though it was never officially confirmed by station executives.

On July 19, 2012, Newport Television announced the sale of WPMI and WJTC, along with five other television stations to the Sinclair Broadcast Group (the owner of WEAR-TV and WFGX). However, due to Federal Communications Commission (FCC) rules which forbid both one company from owning two of the four highest-rated stations or more than two stations overall in the same market, the licenses of WPMI and WJTC were transferred to Deerfield Media, although Sinclair would operate the two stations under a local marketing agreement. The transaction was completed on December 3, 2012. As in certain other markets where Sinclair operates two "Big Three" or "Big Four" affiliates, and due to the stations' distance from Pensacola, many of the operations of WPMI and WJTC remain separate from those of WEAR-TV and WFGX.

On July 28, 2021, the FCC issued a Forfeiture Order against Deerfield Media stemming from a lawsuit involving WPMI-TV. The lawsuit, filed by AT&T, alleged that owner Deerfield Media failed to negotiate for retransmission consent in good faith for WPMI and other Sinclair-managed stations. Deerfield was ordered to pay a fine of $512,228 per station named in the lawsuit, including WPMI.

News operation

WPMI presently broadcasts 27 hours of local newscasts each week (with five hours each weekday, and one hour each on Saturdays and Sundays). WPMI's news coverage primarily focuses on Mobile, Alabama and the Florida Panhandle including Escambia, Santa Rosa and Okaloosa counties.

Clear Channel Communications decided to start a full-fledged news department for WPMI shortly after the station took the NBC affiliation; the station debuted its local newscasts on January 1, 1996, with an hour-long 6 a.m. newscast, half-hour newscasts at noon and 5 p.m. on weekdays and evening newscasts at 5 and 10 p.m. nightly.

On March 17, 2006, WPMI aired a report featuring interviews with several unidentified African American residents in Crichton, Alabama describing or speculating about a leprechaun that had reportedly been spotted in a neighborhood tree. The video went viral on the Internet and became widely known as the "Crichton Leprechaun" on websites such as YouTube and Google Video. The story gained national media attention from pundits such as Fox News' Bill O'Reilly and was referenced in episodes of South Park, Web Junk 20, and Tosh.0, where host Daniel Tosh called the "Crichton Leprechaun" the "Gone with the Wind of Internet videos." The video has registered millions of hits and has since spawned a website selling T-shirts inspired by the video.

On August 24, 2009, WPMI adopted the "Local 15" branding, beginning with its 5 p.m. newscast; it also began using "The Weather Authority" as the brand for its weather forecasts. Both brands are a nod to Cincinnati, Ohio sister station WKRC-TV, which has been known as "Local 12" since 2004 and used "The Weather Authority" name for its weather branding since the late 1980s. On April 22, 2012, WPMI-TV became the fourth and last television station in the Mobile-Pensacola market to begin broadcasting its local newscasts in high definition; the transition occurred the day after WALA-TV upgraded its own newscasts to HD.

On September 9, 2013, WPMI expanded its weekday morning newscast by a half-hour to 4:30 a.m. That same day, it also expanded its weekday noon newscast to one hour with the addition of a half-hour at 12:30 p.m. On September 23, 2013, WPMI began producing two half-hour evening newscasts on sister station WJTC that airs weeknights at 6:30 and 9 p.m.; the 9 p.m. newscast competes with WALA's longer-established prime time newscast (which comparatively runs for one hour) and ironically, also competes with fellow sister station WFGX's 9 p.m. newscast that is produced by WEAR-TV (a half-hour program that debuted one month earlier on August 12, 2013). The 6:30 newscast was canceled in 2016 and the 9 p.m. newscast was moved to 7 p.m. in 2018.

In June 2015, the 4:30 a.m. newscast was canceled; under FCC regulations, a company providing more than 15% of a station's programming per week would have an "attributable interest" in the station, thus counting as ownership. Sinclair cannot hold an attributable interest in WPMI due to its ownership of WEAR, as both stations rank among the top four in the market.

In September 2016, WPMI scaled their noon newscast back to a half-hour to make room for the daily lifestyle program Gulf Coast Today.

In November 2019, WPMI announced they were hiring meteorologist Alan Sealls, who had worked at rival station WKRG for over 20 years until failing to reach a new contract with station management. He made his on-air debut in January 2020.

Technical information

Subchannels
The station's digital signal is multiplexed:

Analog-to-digital conversion
WPMI-TV discontinued regular programming on its analog signal, over UHF channel 15, on June 12, 2009, the official date in which full-power television stations in the United States transitioned from analog to digital broadcasts under federal mandate. The station's digital signal relocated from its pre-transition UHF channel 47 to channel 15 for post-transition operations.

References

External links

PMI-TV
NBC network affiliates
Quest (American TV network) affiliates
Stadium (sports network) affiliates
Sinclair Broadcast Group
Television channels and stations established in 1982
1982 establishments in Alabama